Chicomurex laciniatus, common name the laciniated murex, is a species of sea snail, a marine gastropod mollusk in the family Muricidae, the murex snails or rock snails.

Description
The size of an adult shell varies between 30 mm and 77 mm.

Distribution
This marine species is found off the Philippines and Northern Queensland, Australia.

References

 Merle D., Garrigues B. & Pointier J.-P. (2011) Fossil and Recent Muricidae of the world. Part Muricinae. Hackenheim: Conchbooks. 648 pp. page(s): 110

External links
 

Muricidae
Gastropods described in 1841